A by-election was held for the New South Wales Legislative Assembly electorate of Wallsend on 17 December 1988 because of the death of Ken Booth.

It was won by Labor candidate John Mills in the absence of a Liberal candidate. Mills had been Booth's preferred successor, and although several Labor ministers had lost their seats at the previous election, it was reported that due to "considerable disaffection with the ALP in the region at the last election" and multiple seats lost to independents the party was keen to see Booth elected with "as little fuss as possible". Mills won the seat against three independents with over 55% of the vote, although there was only a "modest" voter turnout of about 80%. The timing of the by-election had been unusual, just over a week before Christmas, and had been attacked by Opposition Leader Bob Carr as "unheard of" and likely to decrease turnout.

Dates

Results

Ken Booth died.

See also
Electoral results for the district of Wallsend
List of New South Wales state by-elections

Notes

References

1988 elections in Australia
New South Wales state by-elections
1980s in New South Wales